Basni railway station is a railway station on the North Western Railways network in the state of Rajasthan. Its code is BANE. It serves Jodhpur city. The station consists of two platforms. The platforms are not well sheltered. It lacks many facilities including water and sanitation.

Important trains

Some of the important trains that run from Basni are:

 Delhi–Barmer Link Express
 Malani Express 
 Bhildi–Jodhpur Demu
 Barmer–Jodhpur Passenger 
 Barmer–Jodhpur DMU
 Jodhpur–Palanpur DMU
 Ajmer–Jodhpur Fast Passenger
 Ahmedabad–Jodhpur Passenger

References

Railway stations in Jodhpur district
Transport in Jodhpur
Jodhpur railway division
Buildings and structures in Jodhpur